The 1947 Clemson Tigers baseball team represented Clemson University in the 1947 NCAA baseball season. The team played their home games at Riggs Field in Clemson, South Carolina.

The team was coached by Randy Hinson, who completed his fourth season at Clemson.  The Tigers were invited to the first NCAA baseball tournament, where they fell to Yale in the first game in the history of the event.

Joe Landrum was named to the first college baseball All-America Team.

Roster

Schedule

Awards and honors 
Joe Landrum
All-America First team

References

Clemson
Clemson Tigers baseball seasons
Clemson baseball
Southern Conference baseball champion seasons
Clemson